The Skinners Falls – Milanville Bridge is a bridge spanning the Delaware River between Milanville, Pennsylvania and Cochecton, New York in Wayne County, Pennsylvania and Sullivan County, New York. The bridge was constructed by the American Bridge Company and funded by the Milanville Bridge Company. The bridge replaced a ferry run by raftsman Daniel Skinner and his family. The bridge opened in 1902 and remained in service up until recently. It is one of several bridges in Sullivan County that are on the National Register of Historic Places, including the Roebling Aqueduct and Pond Eddy Bridge.

Early history and construction (1764–1902) 
In 1764, the crossing from Skinners Falls to Milanville was the location of timber rafting for one of the most prominent families in the area, the Skinners. That year, Daniel Skinner took the first timber raft down the Delaware River. Completing this accomplishment, Skinner received the name "Lord High Admiral", an honor that still stands to this date. The Skinners lived in a place christened as Milanville, but was known more locally as Skinners Falls. Along with his brother, Volney, Milton Skinner also operated a local sawmill in Pennsylvania. For many years, these two rivermen remained prominent in the area.

The idea to construct a bridge in the area did not arise until the 20th Century. In 1900 and 1901, politicians started to feel it was appropriate to build a bridge in the area. A firm, run by Milton L. Skinner, first opened in 1901 to help sell stock, construct the bridge, and then follow it by operating it for the general public. The firm, named the Milanville Bridge Company, was located in the community of Milanville on the Pennsylvania side. At the time the name of the bridge was referred to as the Milanville Bridge, but eventually, locals referred it as the "Skinners Falls Bridge".  The corporation received the charter from the state of Pennsylvania to construct the bridge in the later months of 1901. The firm hired the American Bridge Company to construct the bridge. Construction did not get far, before an ice flood raised the river to the second story level of Milanville homes. This, along with local opposition, caused a short delay in construction.

The owners said that the bridge was unnecessary, and the issues eventually reached the state capital of New York, Albany. The attorney of the Cochecton Bridge, John Anderson, went to the capital to fight the construction of the bridge. The most noticed objection to the companies was that the bridge under construction could only handle one lane of traffic, increasing the necessity of the other two bridges for people in a hurry. Objections decreased with the compromise, and the American Bridge Company finished construction of the bridge in November 1902, the total cost being $14,000.

Private ownership (1902–1920s) 

After construction of the Skinners Falls–Milanville Bridge was completed in late 1902, tolls were immediately charged along the one lane structure. However, unlike the other two bridges, the Skinners Falls–Milanville Bridge cost $0.22 (1902 USD). A person traveling on foot did not have to pay to cross the structure. This decision was different compared to the other bridges, which made it separate. Another decision was that ministers were not tolled so they could better serve their communities. However, when one minister began to abuse the special privilege, he was charged $0.05 for crossing. The tollhouse for collection was in Milanville and was run by the Dexter family.

Just two years after opening, a flood in March 1904 did serious damage to the structure. However, the owners hired the Horseheads Bridge Company, run by the Perkins brothers. They charged $7,000 (1904 USD) to complete repairs of the bridge. With the reopening of the bridge, and along with the newly constructed Erie Railroad station, a new revitalization came to Skinners Falls and Milanville, including an acid company, creamery, and a dairy company, which helped raise income for the bridge using the $0.22 toll. One company that could not make it is the Skinners' timber rafting, which had been in business for over 140 years. In 1914, J. Skinner was the new owner, but the company was devastated when one of their timber rafts collided with a Myers family-owned ferryboat, killing four. The blame was placed on the ferry operator. However, along with the tragedy, the lack of riverside forests made it hard for timber rafting to prosper and in 1914, they closed their doors.

Bridge Commission ownership (1920s–present) 
With the opening of the New York – Pennsylvania Joint Bridge Commission, a predecessor of the current Delaware River Joint Toll Bridge Commission, in the 1920s to buy out these bridges from private ownership, the tolls along the bridges of the Delaware were beginning to come to an end. The Commission offered the Bridge Company an offer of $19,542.22 (1920s USD). The company took the offer and under new ownership, the tolls were eliminated. The bridge had more activity after the elimination of tolls and business continued to prosper. With the new owners, the bridge was kept under routine maintenance, and the bridge has continued to maintain a strong structure. Even with the floods from Hurricanes Connie and Diane of 1955 and the 1960s, the bridge survived with little to no structural damage. From May to October 1986, the commission closed the bridge to do some renovations. The wooden deck was replaced, the entire bridge was painted, and new guide rails were constructed. The 3 ton (6000 lb) weight limit remained after the revamping. On November 14, 1988, the bridge was added to the National Register of Historic Places.

Repeated bridge closures 

On January 19, 2010, the Pennsylvania Department of Transportation shut down access to the Skinners Falls – Milanville Bridge when a truss member of the bridge was found to be defective. The bridge was supposed to undergo rehabilitation of the truss members later in the year for $200,000 (2010 USD) and a larger $8 million (2015 USD) rehabilitation in 2015.  As of July 2013, the bridge is in operation and open to vehicle traffic.

An inspection on December 11, 2015 revealed that the bridge's suspension wires were twisted and out of line, making the bridge unsafe to carry vehicles and the 114-year-old bridge will be closed indefinitely, according to the Pennsylvania Department of Transportation.

"This is not something that's going just weeks or even months; it's going to be a while," added DOT spokesman, James May.

Throughout 2016 the necessary repairs were made and as of November 2016 the bridge was once again open to traffic. Height bars were installed at both ends of the bridge to prevent heavy vehicles from being able to use the bridge, which is what caused the most recent damage to the structure.

The bridge was closed once again in early 2018 after more deterioration was found, and the central pier was damaged by an ice jam in the Delaware River. As of November 2018 the bridge was open to traffic, again serving one vehicle in one direction at a time.

As of summer 2020, the bridge is currently closed.

See also 
 List of bridges and tunnels on the National Register of Historic Places in New York
 List of bridges on the National Register of Historic Places in Pennsylvania
 List of crossings of the Delaware River
 New York–Pennsylvania Joint Interstate Bridge Commission
 National Register of Historic Places listings in Sullivan County, New York
 National Register of Historic Places listings in Wayne County, Pennsylvania

References 

Bridges over the Delaware River
Bridges in Wayne County, Pennsylvania
Road bridges on the National Register of Historic Places in New York (state)
Road bridges on the National Register of Historic Places in Pennsylvania
National Register of Historic Places in Sullivan County, New York
Bridges in Sullivan County, New York
Former toll bridges in New York (state)
Former toll bridges in Pennsylvania
Truss bridges in the United States
Metal bridges in the United States
New York–Pennsylvania Joint Interstate Bridge Commission